Kim Won-jin (born August 24, 1984, Seoul) is a South Korean épée fencer who coaches at the Seoul Physical Education High School. Kim Won-jin has placed in the top eight at many international events, winning both the Asian Games and Asian Championships twice. He won the 2006 Asian Games in the men's individual épée. He says the inspirational figure in his life is Shim Jae-sung, another South Korean épéeist.

References

1984 births
Living people
Fencers at the 2008 Summer Olympics
Olympic fencers of South Korea
Asian Games medalists in fencing
Fencers from Seoul
Fencers at the 2006 Asian Games
Fencers at the 2010 Asian Games
South Korean male épée fencers
Korea National Sport University alumni
Asian Games gold medalists for South Korea
Medalists at the 2006 Asian Games
Medalists at the 2010 Asian Games